is a railway station in the city of Ueda, Nagano, Japan, operated by the private railway operating company Ueda Electric Railway.

Lines
Miyoshichō Station is served by the Bessho Line and is 1.5 kilometers from the terminus of the line at Ueda Station.

Station layout
The station consists of one ground-level side platform serving a single bi-directional track. The station is unattended.

History
It was renamed to its present name in December 1927. However, on 1 September 1939 it was renamed  after an Imperial Japanese Army air field established in the area. The name reverted to Miyoshichō Station in 1945 after the end of the war.

Station numbering was introduced in August 2016 with Miyoshichō being assigned station number BE03.

Passenger statistics
In fiscal 2015, the station was used by an average of 24 passengers daily (boarding passengers only).

Surrounding area
Ueda Chikuma High School
Ueda No.4 Middle School

See also
 List of railway stations in Japan

References

External links

 

Railway stations in Japan opened in 1921
Railway stations in Nagano Prefecture
Ueda Electric Railway
Ueda, Nagano